Romée Elke Henk Leuchter (born 12 January 2001) is a Dutch professional footballer who plays as a striker for Ajax and the Netherlands national team.

Club career
A former player of CTO Zuid, Leuchter joined PSV in 2019. On 7 June 2021, she joined Ajax on a three-year deal.

International career
Leuchter has represented Netherlands at different youth levels. She made her senior team debut on 16 February 2022 in a 1–1 draw against Brazil. On 17 July 2022, she scored her first two senior team goals in a 4–1 UEFA Women's Euro 2022 group stage win against Switzerland.

Career statistics

International

Scores and results list Netherlands' goal tally first, score column indicates score after each Leuchter goal.

Honours
PSV
 KNVB Women's Cup: 2020–21

Ajax
 KNVB Women's Cup: 2021–22

References

External links
 
Senior national team profile at Onsoranje.nl (in Dutch)
Under-23 national team profile at Onsoranje.nl (in Dutch)
Under-19 national team profile at Onsoranje.nl (in Dutch)
Under-17 national team profile at Onsoranje.nl (in Dutch)
Under-16 national team profile at Onsoranje.nl (in Dutch)
Under-15 national team profile at Onsoranje.nl (in Dutch)

2001 births
Living people
Dutch women's footballers
Netherlands women's international footballers
Eredivisie (women) players
PSV (women) players
AFC Ajax (women) players
UEFA Women's Euro 2022 players
Sportspeople from Heerlen
Footballers from Limburg (Netherlands)
Women's association football forwards
21st-century Dutch women